James Howe (born 1946) is an American author of juvenile books.

James Howe may also refer to:

Sir James Howe, 2nd Baronet (died 1736), English politician
James Howe (painter) (1780–1836), Scottish animal painter 
James Henry Howe (1827–1893), U.S. federal judge
James R. Howe (1839–1914), U.S. Representative from New York
James Henderson Howe (1839–1920), farmer and politician in South Australia
James Peter Howe (1854–1917), Australian politician
James Hamilton Howe (1856–1934), U.S. pianist and dean of the music school at DePauw University
James Wong Howe (1899–1976), Chinese-born American cinematographer
James D. Howe (1948–1970), U.S. Medal of Honor recipient during the Vietnam War